Diário de Pernambuco (Pernambuco Daily) is a newspaper published in Recife, Brazil. The newspaper began publication on 7 November 1825. It is the oldest continuously circulating daily in Latin America and the oldest continuously circulating newspaper edited in Portuguese.

See also
List of newspapers in Brazil

References

External links 

 Diario de Pernambuco digital archives

Diários Associados
Diario Pernambuco
1825 establishments in Brazil
Publications established in 1825
Organisations based in Recife